Aaron Opoku-Tiawiah (born 28 March 1999) is a German professional footballer who plays as a left winger for  club 1. FC Kaiserslautern.

Career
Opoku made his professional debut for Hansa Rostock in the 3. Liga on 20 July 2019, starting in the home match against Viktoria Köln. He scored with a backheel in the 19th minute to put Rostock 3–0 ahead, before being substituted out in the 67th minute for Marco Königs, with the match finishing as a 3–3 draw. 

He was loaned to Jahn Regensburg for the 2020–21 season. 

On 31 August 2022, Opoku signed with 1. FC Kaiserslautern.

Personal life
Opoku was born in Hamburg, Germany and is of Ghanaian descent.

References

External links
 
 Profile at kicker.de

1999 births
Living people
Footballers from Hamburg
German footballers
Germany youth international footballers
German sportspeople of Ghanaian descent
Association football wingers
Hamburger SV II players
Hamburger SV players
FC Hansa Rostock players
SSV Jahn Regensburg players
VfL Osnabrück players
1. FC Kaiserslautern players
2. Bundesliga players
3. Liga players
Regionalliga players